George Collins (born December 9, 1955) is a former American football offensive tackle who played ten seasons in the National Football League (NFL).

Early life and high school
Collins was born in Macon, Georgia and attended Warner Robins High School. He was named All-State and an All-American as a senior.

College career
Collins was a member of the Georgia Bulldogs for four seasons. He began his collegiate career as a tight end, but was moved to the guard position by coaches who recognized his blocking abilities and encouraged him to gain weight. He became a starter at guard and was named first-team All-Southeastern Conference and a first-team All-American by the Sporting News.

Professional career
Collins was selected in the fourth round of the 1978 NFL Draft by the St. Louis Cardinals. He played five seasons with the Cardinals, playing in 69 games with 26 starts. Collins started 13 games during the 1981 season, taking over at left tackle after starter Keith Wortman was waived. He was traded to the San Francisco 49ers in April of 1983, but was cut during training camp. Collins was later signed by the Jacksonville Bulls of the United States Football League and spent two seasons with the team.

Coaching career
After retiring from professional football Collins returned to Georgia as a graduate assistant and earned a master of education degree. He became an offensive line coach at Valdosta State University after graduating. He later entered teaching and was the head football coach at Perry High School, Houston County High School and Rutland High School before retiring in 2015.

References

1955 births
Living people
American football offensive tackles
Georgia Bulldogs football players
Jacksonville Bulls players
St. Louis Cardinals (football) players
San Francisco 49ers players
Valdosta State Blazers football coaches
High school football coaches in Georgia (U.S. state)
Sportspeople from Macon, Georgia
People from Warner Robins, Georgia
Players of American football from Georgia (U.S. state)